Karsten Baumann (born 14 October 1969) is a German football manager and former player who last managed Hansa Rostock.

Playing career
He spent twelve years in the Bundesliga where he was mainly a player within the squad.

During his youth he played one match for the Germany national U-21 team.

Coaching career
Baumann started his coaching career at Rot-Weiß Erfurt when he was hired on 19 February 2008. His first match as head coach was a 5–0 win against the reserve team of VfL Wolfsburg on 23 February 2008. He finished the 2007–08 season in seventh place and promotion to the first ever 3. Liga season. Baumann was sacked on 28 April 2009, three days after Rot-Weiß Erfurt lost to Kickers Emden 1–0.

His next job was at VfL Osnabrück when he was appointed on 12 June 2009. His first match as head coach of Osnabrück was a 1–0 loss to Eintracht Braunschweig. He was sacked on 21 March 2011 after losing 3–1 to Alemannia Aachen.

Then on 22 February 2012, Erzgebirge Aue hired Baumann as head coach after Rico Schmitt was sacked the previous day. His first match as head coach of Erzgebirge Aue was a 2–0 loss to Energie Cottbus. He was sacked on 28 April 2013. His final match was a 0–0 draw against MSV Duisburg.

He then took over the job at Duisburg on 8 July 2013. On 15 April 2014, Duisburg announced that Baumann wouldn't return for another season and had his final match on 15 May 2014 in the state cup final which Duisburg won 5–2.

On 9 December 2014, he was hired as the head coach of Hansa Rostock. He was sacked on 5 December 2015.

Coaching record

References

External links
 

1969 births
Living people
German footballers
German football managers
Bundesliga players
2. Bundesliga players
VfB Oldenburg players
1. FC Köln II players
1. FC Köln players
Borussia Dortmund players
Rot-Weiß Oberhausen players
Wuppertaler SV players
SG Wattenscheid 09 players
Germany under-21 international footballers
FC Viktoria Köln players
FC Erzgebirge Aue managers
FC Rot-Weiß Erfurt managers
MSV Duisburg managers
2. Bundesliga managers
VfL Osnabrück managers
FC Hansa Rostock managers
Association football defenders
3. Liga managers
Sportspeople from Oldenburg
Footballers from Lower Saxony
West German footballers